Bangriposi is a town in Mayurbhanj district, Odisha, India.

Geography

Location
National Highway 49 passes through Bangriposi.
The town is surrounded by Similipal National park. The temple of Goddess Maa Dwarasuni is situated here. Budhabalanga river passes through Bangriposi. Bangriposi railway station serves with all the necessary facilities to the peoples. It has a great role in promoting tourism here.

Demographics 
Bangriposi is a medium size village located in Bangiriposi of Mayurbhanj district, Odisha with 130 families. The Bangriposi village has population of 525 of which 274 are males while 251 are females as per Population Census 2011.

In Bangriposi village population of children with age 0-6 is 56 which makes up 10.67% of total population of village. Average Sex Ratio of Bangriposi village is 916 which is lower than Odisha state average of 979. Child Sex Ratio for the Bangriposi as per census is 1074, higher than Odisha average of 941.

Bangriposi village has lower literacy rate compared to Odisha. In 2011, literacy rate of Bangriposi village was 69.72% compared to 72.87% of Odisha. In Bangriposi Male literacy stands at 80.16% while female literacy rate was 58.11%.

As per constitution of India and Panchyati Raaj Act, Bangriposi village is administrated by Sarpanch (Head of Village) who is elected representative of village.

References

External links
 Wikimapia

Cities and towns in Mayurbhanj district